The Smoggies (or rather, The Suntots) is a 1989-1990 animated children's television show by Cinar.

The show took place on or around the fictional Coral Island, and revolved around a group of island-dwelling people called the Suntots and a trio of polluting treasure hunters called the Smoggies. The Suntots spent much of their time defending their island paradise from the Smoggies, who polluted everything around them and lived on a coal fired steam ship, the SS Stinky Poo, which polluted the water and air around the island. The Smoggies constantly tried to destroy the Suntots' home for their own benefits.

Almost every episode had the environmentalist Suntots outsmarting the Smoggies latest scheme, after which the Smoggies invariably hatched another scheme. Thus, the show also explains the importance of protecting the environment. Ironically, while this show is called "Smoggies", it actually involves the Suntots as the series' starring protagonists, while the series title is meant for the antagonists, the Smoggies.

A recurring theme was their attempt to steal the island's "magic coral" (which the Smoggies believed granted eternal youth), or find some alternative way to maintain youth. The show often implied that the magic coral did not actually exist, however, and were just manifestations of the Smoggies' (mainly Emma's) greed and vanity.

In 1994, the show was rerun on HBO and various local broadcast channels, such as Florida's WTMV32, in the United States under the name Stop the Smoggies. and in France, as SOS Polluards. In Quebec, it was aired under the name Touftoufs et Polluards. The show was broadcast in Ireland on RTÉ2 and in the United Kingdom on the BBC under its original Canadian title.  It screened in New Zealand on afternoon television on TVNZ.

Voice Cast
Teddy Lee Dillon: Chip, Additional voices
Brian Dooley: Additional voices
Richard M. Dumont: Cool, Additional voices
Karen Marginson: Miss Doctor, Little, Choosy, Cookie (voice 2), Additional voices
Walter Massey: Polluto
Stephanie Morgenstern: Princess Lila
Joan Orenstein: Emma
Rick Jones: Captain Clarence (voice 1), Uncle Boom (voice 1), Sport (voice 1), Scaredy (voice 1), Sailor (voice 1), Choo-Choo (voice 1), Tricks (voice 1)
Bronwen Mantel: Cookie (voice 1), Additional voices
Terrence Scammell: Speed (voice 1), Gardener (voice 1)
Harvey Berger: Captain Clarence (voice 2), Uncle Boom (voice 2), Scaredy (voice 2), Sailor (voice 2), Choo-Choo (voice 2), Tricks (voice 2)
Pier Paquette: Speed (voice 2), Gardener (voice 2), Sport (voice 2)

Main characters

The Suntots
Princess Lila: Somewhat taller than other Suntots, her body has more human-like dimensions, as opposed to the pudginess of her subjects. Her hairstyle is also entirely different from the other Suntots and she is the only one with red hair. The rest of the Suntots regard her as a leader. Emma considers her a thorn in her side, but Princess Lila keeps trying to convince Emma that the magic coral does not exist.
Speed: Somewhat daring, outspoken and headstrong for a Suntot, his fast-swimming ability earned him his name. He is usually the one to think of a solution to the Suntots' problems. He has bright blue hair, and he and Princess Lila are often partners in their adventures of solving problems; they are the real heroes of the series.
Chip: The brilliant orange-haired engineer for the Suntots. Chip invents and builds various things, using environmentally friendly methods. A bit quieter than Speed or Princess Lila, he often joins them on their adventures, but is more of a sidekick, as he rarely takes charge of a situation.
Uncle Boom: The oldest Suntot and only one with white hair. He is the self-appointed mayor of Suntot Town. He makes speeches whenever he gets the chance, but is rather absent-minded and bungling.

The Smoggies
Emma: The self-appointed leader of the Smoggies, she has a short temper and a fear of growing old, and is always trying to think of a scheme to get her way. She always bosses her two cohorts around, and is obsessed with finding the magic coral, thinking that that is what keeps the Suntots young. Polluto calls her "Miss Emma". She is also a bully and has no qualms about lying or being deceitful in getting her own way.
Clarence: Emma's husband and the captain of a polluting coal fired ship called the Stinky-Poo. He is also an inventor and scientist, but his inventions rarely work the right way. Most of the time, he is spineless towards Emma and rarely temperamental, but he can get frustrated himself if things do not work out. Polluto calls him "the Captain" or "Captain Clarence."
Polluto: Clarence's only crewmate. He is rather dimwitted, as Emma always points out, but he is the Smoggie with most of the practical skills. He runs the engine room (for some reason, he eats coal and oil), and acts as cook, pilot, mechanic and custodian. He is often shown to have a warm heart, so his polluting tendencies are more related to ignorance and a desire to do his job. Sometimes he is friends with the Suntots but can just as quickly turn against them when ordered to chase them by Emma.

Supporting characters
Other Suntots: Other recurring Suntots, besides Princess Lila, Speed, Chip and Uncle Boom, are minor or supporting characters, but most were the focus of one or more episodes. Each is named after one overbearing character trait (often related their job).
Sport: A yellow-haired all-around talented athlete who wears a sweatband and a number 8 shirt. He is also a bit of a show-off and occasionally acts before thinking. One episode he befriends a bird and ended up being kidnapped by the Smoggies and the Smoggies tied up Sport in a burlap sack. Later, Suntots rescue the bird and him.
Little: The youngest Suntot, with bluish-green hair. He is childish, playful, curious and short (even for a Suntot) and has a bit of an inferiority complex.
Cool: A laid-back hipster and musician who prefers to work on his songs than do other work. He has light blue hair and sunglasses, and is usually concerned as to whether something is "cool".
Miss Doctor: The Suntots' doctor, veterinarian and animal life expert. She is calm, logical, motherly and reserved, and has pale green hair and spectacles.
Gardener: The Suntots' resident plant life and farming expert. He has dark green hair and spends most of his time growing fruits and vegetables in his greenhouse or on his farm.
Cookie: She has pink hair, and all Suntots love anything she cooks. Her focus on her cooking sometimes makes her forget about other things.
Sailor: The Suntot who can sail a boat better than anyone. He has navy blue hair, a moustache, and speaks with stereotypical sailor slang and a thick accent.
Scaredy: The very easily frightened orange-haired Suntot. Deep down, however, he has hidden courage. He and Sport are best friends.
Choo-Choo: The orange-haired, sentimental driver of the steam locomotive "No. 9".
Tricks: The practical joker with orange hair who occasionally likes frightening Scaredy.
Choosy: The yellow-haired Suntot who can never make up her mind about anything.
Lumber: The Suntots' pink-haired forestry and conservation expert who can identify any kind of tree by its wood.
Hobo: Purple-haired Suntot who hates having baths. Apart from Sailor and Uncle Boom, he is the only other Suntot with facial hair.
Town Crier: The purple-haired Suntot whose only role is to say "Big meeting in the town square!"
Turtle Tom: A sea turtle and a friend of the Suntots. He does not speak, but the top of his shell opens like a hatch so that Suntots can ride him above or below the water. He sometimes comes ashore if the Suntots need his strength to help move something.
Pelican Pete: A pelican and another Suntot animal friend who provides air transportation when needed.
Arnold: A great white shark with a friendly disposition. He sometimes helps the Suntots with transport and any tasks that require brute strength deep under water. Despite his pleasant nature, Polluto is terrified of him.
Winston: A white sperm whale who communicates with sonar. His archenemy is a giant squid called Old One-Eye.
Ralph Robin: Polluto's pet bird (who, in spite of his name is not a robin, but a yellow bird) who rides on Polluto's head and only speaks in warbles and squawks that Polluto seems able to understand.

Episodes
The following dates represent the first US broadcasts.

DVD release
On 26 September 2006, a DVD entitled Stop The Smoggies - Anti-Pollution Revolution DVD was released in Region 1. It contains the first four episodes of the series.

Opening credits
The main title theme in the English version was written by Joe Raposo, who also wrote themes for Sesame Street, Shining Time Station, Three's Company, and The Electric Company. This song was also composed by Judy Henderson, who also wrote themes for Arthur, Mona the Vampire, and Sagwa, the Chinese Siamese Cat.

Notes

External links
Retro Junk

TV.com episode guide

1990s Canadian animated television series
1989 Canadian television series debuts
1989 French television series debuts
1990s French animated television series
1990 Canadian television series endings
1990 French television series endings
Villains in animated television series
Canadian children's animated adventure television series
Environmental television
Fictional trios
French children's animated adventure television series
Television series by Cookie Jar Entertainment
Television series by DHX Media